The Adventurers is a 1951 British adventure film directed by David MacDonald and starring Dennis Price, Jack Hawkins, Peter Hammond. In the wake of the Boer War several men journey into the South African veldt in search of diamonds.

It was also known as Fortune in Diamonds, The Great Adventure and The South African Story.

It was one of a series of movies made by the British film industry after World War Two which were set (and filmed) in the dominions.

Plot
In 1902, as the Boer War finalises a South African soldier, Pieter Brandt, hides a cache of diamonds he finds on a body. He returns to the town he left three years earlier where his girl, Anne, has married a disgraced English officer, Clive Hunter.

Needing funds to get back to pick up the diamonds the Boer enlists the help of his former comrade, Hendrik Von Thaal, as well as Hunter and a bar owner called Dominic.

The four men set off to find the diamonds but they end up betraying each other.

Cast
 Dennis Price as Clive Hunter
 Jack Hawkins as Pieter Brandt
 Peter Hammond as Hendrik van Thaal
 Grégoire Aslan as Dominic
 Charles Paton as Barman
 Siobhan McKenna as Anne Hunter
 Bernard Lee as O'Connell
 Ronald Adam as Van Thaal
 Martin Boddey as Chief Engineer
 Philip Ray as Man in Restaurant
 Walter Horsbrugh as Man in Restaurant
 Cyril Chamberlain as Waiter

Production
The film was based on an original story by the novelist and screenwriter Robert Westerby, one of several he wrote for the independent production company Mayflower Pictures.

Jack Hawkins was borrowed from British Lion. Director David MacDonald had just made Diamond City (1949) also on location in South Africa.

It was made at Pinewood Studios, with some location filming in South Africa beforehand near Johannesburg. Production started in May 1950 and was completed by September. The film wasn't released until the following March by General Film Distributors.

Release
The film was originally known as The South Africa Story. It had its world premiere aboard the Queen Mary liner. The film was cut by 12 minutes for its U.S. release, and was twice retitled, as Fortune in Diamonds and  The Great Adventure.

Critical reception
Allmovie noted "an African variation of Treasure of the Sierra Madre, The Adventurers is buoyed by an unusually vicious performance by Jack Hawkins" ; while the Radio Times wrote, "this could have been quite stirring if it hadn't been morbidly under-directed at a snail's pace by David MacDonald" ; and TV Guide found that, despite its borrowings  from Sierra Madre and from von Stroheim's Greed, "it is nevertheless an often-gripping film."

References

External links

The Adventurers at TCMDB

1951 films
British historical adventure films
1950s historical adventure films
Films directed by David MacDonald (director)
Films shot at Pinewood Studios
Films set in 1902
Films set in South Africa
Films shot in South Africa
Treasure hunt films
Lippert Pictures films
British black-and-white films
1950s English-language films
1950s British films